Holigost (sometimes rendered as Holy Ghost) was a carrack of the English navy rebuilt for Henry V. Originally a Castillian vessel called Santa Clara, she was captured c.1413–14. She served until 1422 and later sank at her moorings. Her wreck is believed to have been found in the River Hamble, Hampshire, near the wreck of her larger contemporary, the Grace Dieu. The wreck is a Protected Wreck managed by Historic England.

Description
Holigost was a carrack, measuring in excess of  length and  beam. She was measured at 760 tons Builder's Old Measurement. The ship had a crew of about 200 sailors. She also carried up to 260 troops. Armament was seven cannon, 102 gads (iron spears), bows and arrows, spears and poleaxes.

History
Holigost was the second of the four "great ships" commissioned by Henry V, and which also included the Trinity Royal, Jesus, and Grace Dieu. She was originally a Castillian ship, Santa Clara, which was captured in 1413–14 and subsequently rebuilt. Holigost "joined the royal fleet" on 17 November 1415. She saw action in at least two battles during the Hundred Years' War. She participated in a naval battle off Harfleur in 1416. Following repairs to damage received there, she participated in a battle off Saint-Denis-Chef-de-Cove in 1417. Holigost was withdrawn from service in 1422 — the year of Henry's death — and laid up in the River Hamble, Southamptonshire. Repairs made in 1423 by Davy Owen may be the earliest recorded use of a diver in ship repair in England. It is believed that she eventually sank in the Hamble due to a lack of maintenance.

Wreck
In 2015, it was announced that it was thought that the wreck of Holigost lay in the River Hamble. The wreck had been identified on an aerial photograph taken in the 1970s. Historic England is taking steps to protect the wreck before it is surveyed. A lack of funding is the reason behind the 40-year delay between the discovery of the wreck and work to survey the vessel beginning. The survey will include the use of dendrochronology, drones, remote sensing and sonar.

See also
Quanzhou ship
Baochuan
Jong (ship)

External links 

 "Grace Dieu and the possible site of the Holigost" National Heritage List for England

References

Carracks
15th-century ships
Ships of the Castillian navy
Ships of the English navy
Individual sailing vessels
Shipwrecks in rivers
History of Hampshire